SN 2005E (aka 2005-1032) was a calcium-rich supernova first observed in January 2005 that scientists concluded was a new type of cosmic explosion. The explosion originated in the galaxy NGC 1032, approximately 100 million light years away. 

Location:   (Epoch J2000)

Research and Conclusions
On May 19, 2010, a team of astronomers released a report on the discoveries made in their research of SN 2005E.  The articles were published in the British journal Nature.

The researchers have determined that the blast emitted a large amount of calcium and titanium, which is evidence of a nuclear reaction involving helium, instead of the carbon and oxygen that is characteristic of Type Ia supernovae.

References

External links
 Light curves and spectra on the Open Supernova Catalog

Supernovae
Cetus (constellation)